Adolfo Reyes C. Guillot (4 February 1890 – 26 March 1968) was a Spanish journalist, novelist, essayist and playwright. He was the son of the famous writer from Malaga Arturo Reyes Aguilar and Carmen Conejo. Primarily self-taught, he learned several foreign languages, including Latin, Greek, Arabic and German, but worked most of the time as a clerk, journalist and educator, participating in the foundations of a series of local cultural institutions. His writings, characteristic for their elegant style and gentle irony, cover the genres of short story, novel, essay, memoir and drama.

Works

Novels
Las Cenizas del Sándalo (1916)
El Carro de Asalto (1922)

Essays
Ensayos moriscos (1936)
Ideario en estampas (1947)

Theater
Peranzul
Don Lope de Sosa
Tragedia de villanos
La Danzarina y el Flautista
Idilio antiguo

References 

Spanish journalists
Spanish writers
Spanish dramatists and playwrights
1890 births
1968 deaths